Phillip de Wet is a South African journalist and the author of Nkandla: The Great Unravelling.

In October 2017, he won a national journalism award for a column about wine gums.

De Wet was the founding deputy editor of daily online newspaper Daily Maverick, which credited him with much of its initial personality. He was also a founder of that website's defunct predecessor magazine, Maverick.

In October 2015 he was appointing as acting deputy editor of newspaper Mail & Guardian. Five years earlier that newspaper had described him as a "journalism school dropout".

In February 2017 police sought to question De Wet about the leak of a draft government report he had written about.

In February 2018 De Wet was appointed as associated editor of Business Insider South Africa.

After Business Insider South Africa closed down with De Wet as acting editor, he was appointed writer-at-large for News24 (website).

References 

Year of birth missing (living people)
Living people
South African journalists
South African writers